Johnson Monteiro Pinto Macaba (born November 23, 1978 in Luanda), or simply Johnson Macaba, is an Angolan football striker.

Football career
The striker has played for Malatyaspor in Turkey, Portuguesa de Desportos and Goiás in Brazil.

Johnson signed a three-year contract with Malatyaspor in summer 2002. He made seven league appearances, and almost loaned to Konyaspor in summer 2003. But the loan deal had failed. Johnson stayed with Malatyaspor, made two more league appearances, before the contract was mutually terminated in May 2004.

He signed a contract run until December 2010 with Goiás of Brazilian Série A in June 2006.

He was on loan to Santa Cruz of Série B in July 2007.

At the beginning of CSL Season 2008, He was transferred to Shenzhen Shangqingyin.

In February 2010, he came to China again and was loaned to Chengdu Blades which was newly demoted from the top flight by CFA for match-fixing scandal.

International career
Johnson is better known in Brazil, than in his home country Angola, where the people had doubts about his call-up for 2006 African Cup of Nations.

National team statistics

References

External links
 
 
 

1978 births
Living people
Footballers from Luanda
Angolan footballers
Angola international footballers
2006 Africa Cup of Nations players
2010 Africa Cup of Nations players
Angolan expatriate footballers
Expatriate footballers in Brazil
Associação Atlética Francana players
União Agrícola Barbarense Futebol Clube players
Sociedade Esportiva do Gama players
Londrina Esporte Clube players
Expatriate footballers in Turkey
Malatyaspor footballers
América Futebol Clube (SP) players
Clube Atlético Juventus players
Associação Portuguesa de Desportos players
Goiás Esporte Clube players
Santa Cruz Futebol Clube players
Expatriate footballers in China
Shenzhen F.C. players
Chengdu Tiancheng F.C. players
Chinese Super League players
China League One players
Süper Lig players
Clube Atlético Sorocaba players
Association football forwards